Huayna Potosí is a mountain in Bolivia, located near El Alto and about 25 km north of La Paz in the Cordillera Real.

 
Huayna Potosí is the closest high mountain to La Paz.  Surrounded by high mountains, it is roughly 15 miles due north of the city, which makes this mountain the most popular climb in Bolivia. The normal ascent route is a fairly straightforward glacier climb, with some crevasses and a steep climb to the summit. However, the other side of the mountain—Huayna Potosí West Face—is the biggest face in Bolivia. Several difficult snow and ice routes ascend this 1000 meter high face.

The first ascent of the normal route was undertaken in 1919 by Germans Rudolf Dienst and Adolf Schulze. Some climbing books report this mountain as the "easiest 6000er in the world", but this claim is debatable. The easiest route entails an exposed ridge and sections of moderately steep ice, with a UIAA rating of PD. There are many 6000m mountains that are easier to climb in terms of technical difficulty. Perhaps therefore, the main reason Huayna Potosí has been referred to as the easiest 6000m climb is that the elevation gain from trailhead to summit is less than 1400 m; with easy access from La Paz. Since La Paz is at 3640 m, climbers have an easier time acclimatizing.

Climbing history of the mountain
In 1877 a group of six German climbers tried to climb Huayna Potosí for the first time. Without proper equipment and with little practical information, they set off toward the unclimbed peak. Their unsuccessful attempt met with tragedy. Four climbers died at an altitude around 5600m; the remaining two managed to retreat in deteriorating conditions, but died by exhaustion just after finding their way to the Zongo Pass. 21 years later, on 9 September 1898, an expedition of Austrian climbers attempted the mountain ascension again but after five days spent at 5900m they were forced to descend. Finally, in 1919 the Germans R. Dienst and O. Lhose reached the south summit (marginally higher than the north summit) climbing the mountain on the east face on a route that later would become the current normal route, with some variants.

Normal route 
The normal route to climb Huayna Potosí is a straightforward climb on glacier. Following this route the mountain can be climbed in two daily stages. Climbers generally take a 4x4 up the valley on a gravel road from El Alto taking about two hours to reach a car park at 4700m, Zongo Pass(). Where a base camp is established. There is a recently established hut here. Staff are usually happy to book walk ins if they have rooms available, and a reduced price can be negotiated outside of the peak season.

From the hut here it is a 1 – 3 h hike up to the high camp at 5200 m on the snow line (Time taken depends greatly on acclimatization and fitness). This camp is called locally Campo Argentino and consists of a number of areas of leveled rocks suitable for pitching tents. As of 2006, there is a refuge at the high camp where it is possible to stay the night for around $10. Booking is preferable, and essential during peak season. Conditions are spartan, with all sleeping mattresses placed next to each other on the upper level in two rows.

Most climbers begin their summit attempt between midnight and 3 am. Fit and well acclimatized climbers rise and leave later, overtaking other groups during the climb, and can reach the summit in around 3–4 hours, but people frequently take twice that time. The route is usually very clearly visible between the penitentes, and follows the main glacier up directly (across the bergschrund and directly up a ridge) or along an arête on the right. Following that it curves behind the mountain when viewed from Zongo pass. The final approach is fairly exposed, either directly to the summit, or along the summit ridge. The summit is small and frequently has a pronounced cornice, reducing usable space.

The entire climb from the high camp take between 8 and 12 hours. Very acclimatised parties climb the mountain directly from the hut at Zongo Pass and in this case the whole climb takes the most of the day.

Morning sunshine causes the snow to become less stable for walking, and increases avalanche risk from 8 am onwards. The views on a clear morning from the summit are unbelievable – the mountain is far higher than anything else anywhere nearby, and the Cordillera Real, Lake Titicaca, La Paz, and part of the Altiplano they reside on are all visible. Until early 2004 there was a guest book for summitting climbers to sign. Unfortunately this overhang collapsed in mid-2006 leaving the original metal container protruding out of the summit ridge hanging above the city of La Paz below.

Other routes
In addition to the normal route, a large variety of routes (some of them very technical) to the two summits exist.
 East face, French route to the south summit Difficulty AD-, opened in 1974 by Thierry Cardon and Alain Mesili
 West face, American route to the north summit. Difficulty TD, opened in 1970 by Roman Laba and John Hudson
 West face, Direct route to the north summit. Difficulty TD, opened in 1978 by F. Faure and others
 East face, Triangulo route to the south summit. Difficulty TD+, opened in 1983 by A. Mesili and others

See also 

 Milluni Peak
 Kunturiri
 Potosí mountain range

References

External links

 Huayna Potosi on SummitPost.org
 
 Huayna Potosi West Face

Mountains of La Paz Department (Bolivia)
Glaciers of Bolivia
Mountains of Bolivia
Six-thousanders of the Andes
Climbing areas of Bolivia